Sławatycze  is a village in Biała Podlaska County, Lublin Voivodeship, in eastern Poland, close to the border with Belarus. It is the seat of the gmina (administrative district) called Gmina Sławatycze.

Before the Holocaust, the local Jewish population numbered around 1,300 individuals. In June 1942, the Germans gathered all Jewish citizens in the market square and during the next three days murdered them all. Their bodies were laid in a 100 meter long mass grave in Jewish cemetery in Sławatycze.

The village has a current population of 2,738.

References

External links
 

Villages in Biała Podlaska County
Belarus–Poland border crossings
Brest Litovsk Voivodeship
Siedlce Governorate
Kholm Governorate
Lublin Voivodeship (1919–1939)